Sanna Savolainen is a Finnish ski-orienteering competitor. She won silver medal in the short distance at the 1994 World Ski Orienteering Championships.

See also
 Finnish orienteers
 List of orienteers
 List of orienteering events

References

Finnish orienteers
Female orienteers
Ski-orienteers
Year of birth missing (living people)
Living people